James Guy Taylor (5 November 1917 –  6 March 2001) was an England international footballer born in Hillingdon, Middlesex. He played at centre half.

During his career, he played for Fulham in 261 league matches between 1945 and 1952 and spent two seasons at Queens Park Rangers, for whom he appeared on 41 occasions. He then moved into non-league football as player–manager of Tunbridge Wells United from 1954 to 1958 moving then to Yiewsley. He also played twice for the England national football team, and was part of England's team for the 1950 FIFA World Cup, although he did not play in the tournament.

References

External links
 

1917 births
2001 deaths
Footballers from Hillingdon
English footballers
England international footballers
Association football defenders
Fulham F.C. players
Queens Park Rangers F.C. players
Tunbridge Wells F.C. players
Hillingdon Borough F.C. players
English Football League players
English Football League representative players
1950 FIFA World Cup players
English football managers